Baba Gurinder Singh Ji (born 1954) is the spiritual head of Radha Soami Satsang Beas.

Gurinder Singh may also refer to:
 Gurinder Singh (cricketer) (born 1992), Indian cricketer
 Gurinder Singh (field hockey) (born 1995), Indian field hockey player
 Gurinder Singh (volleyball) (born 1989), Indian volleyball player
 Gurinder Singh Garry Punjab MLA and politician